Brodie Kyle Farber (born July 5, 1980) is an American professional mixed martial artist who most recently competed in the Middleweight division. A professional since 2002, he has competed for the UFC and WEC.

Mixed martial arts career

Early career
Farber made his professional debut in 2002, a win, and compiled a record of 13–3 before being signed by the UFC.

Ultimate Fighting Championship
Farber made his UFC debut at UFC: Silva vs. Irvin on July 19, 2008 against Rory Markham. After tagging and backing Markham up in the first round, Farber was knocked out with a head kick at 1:37.

He returned at UFC: Fight for the Troops on December 10, 2008 facing Luigi Fioravanti. Farber lost via unanimous decision and was later released from the UFC.

Post-UFC
Farber has gone 4–2 since leaving the UFC, last competing in September 2018.

Mixed martial arts record

|-
| Win
| align=center| 17–7
| Mamoru Yamamoto
| Submission (rear-naked choke)
| MEFC 1
| 
| align=center| 1
| align=center| 3:44
| Payson, Arizona, United States
| 
|-
| Win
| align=center| 16–7
| Josh Tamsen
| Submission (guillotine choke)
| MMAX: Maximum Cage Fighting
| 
| align=center| 1
| align=center| 0:17
| Mexico
|Return to Middleweight.
|-
|Loss
|align=center|15–7
|Leonard Smith
|TKO (doctor stoppage)
|Xplode Fighting Series: Anarchy
|
|align=center|2
|align=center|5:00
|Valley Center, California, United States
|Light Heavyweight debut; for the Xplode FS Light Heavyweight Championship.
|-
|Win
|align=center|15–6
|Travis McCullough
|Submission (rear-naked choke)
|Xplode Fighting Series: Brutal Conduct
|
|align=center|1
|align=center|2:11
|Valley Center, California, United States
|
|-
|Win
|align=center|14–6
|Ryan Trotter
|Submission (rear-naked choke) 
|Xplode Fight Series: Rumble off the Reservation
|
|align=center|1
|align=center|1:22
|Valley Center, California, United States
|
|-
|Loss
|align=center|13–6
|Melvin Costa
|TKO (punches) 
|Gladiator Challenge: Royal Flush
|
|align=center|2
|align=center|0:16
|San Jacinto, California, United States
|Middleweight debut.
|-
|Loss
|align=center|13–5
|Luigi Fioravanti
|Decision (unanimous)
|UFC: Fight for the Troops
|
|align=center|3
|align=center|5:00
|Fayetteville, North Carolina, United States
|Catchweight (174 lbs) bout; Farber missed weight.
|-
|Loss
|align=center|13–4
|Rory Markham
|KO (head kick)
|UFC: Silva vs. Irvin
|
|align=center|1
|align=center|1:37
|Las Vegas, United States
|
|-
|Win
|align=center|13–3
|Eduardo Gonzalez
|KO (knees)
|MMAX 18: MMA Xtreme 18
|
|align=center|1
|align=center|0:27
|Tijuana, Mexico
|
|-
|Win
|align=center|12–3
|Miguel Carrasco
|Submission (triangle choke)
|MMAX 16: MMA Xtreme 16
|
|align=center|1
|align=center|2:10
|Mexico City, Mexico
|
|-
|Win
|align=center|11–3
|Francisco Rosas
|Submission (rear-naked choke)
|MMAX 11: MMA Xtreme 11
|
|align=center|1
|align=center|0:45
|Mexico
|
|-
|Win
|align=center|10–3
|Raul Alcala
|TKO (strikes)
|MMAX 7: MMA Xtreme 7
|
|align=center|1
|align=center|0:23
|Tijuana, Mexico
|
|-
|Win
|align=center|9–3
|Nestor Martinez
|Submission (rear naked choke)
|MMAX 4: MMA Xtreme 4
|
|align=center|1
|align=center|0:42
|Tijuana, Mexico
|
|-
|Win
|align=center|8–3
|Stacy Hakes
|TKO (referee stoppage)
|MMAX 4: MMA Xtreme 4
|
|align=center|1
|
|Tijuana, Mexico
|
|-
|Loss
|align=center|7–3
|Brian Warren
|Submission (triangle choke)
|PF 1: The Beginning
|
|align=center|2
|
|Hollywood, California, United States
|
|-
|Win
|align=center|7–2
|John Wood
|Submission (guillotine choke)
|WEF: Sin City
|
|align=center|1
|
|Las Vegas, Nevada, United States
|
|-
|Win
|align=center|6–2
|José Ramos 
|Submission (rear-naked choke)
|TC 8: Total Combat 8
|
|align=center|1
|align=center|0:33
|Tijuana, Mexico
|
|-
|Loss
|align=center|5–2
|Sean Sherk
|Submission (guillotine choke)
|SF 6: Battleground in Reno
|
|align=center|1
|align=center|0:55
|Reno, Nevada, United States
|
|-
|Win
|align=center|5–1
|Hans Marrero
|Decision (split)
|RITC 64: Heart & Soul
|
|align=center|3
|align=center|3:00
|Phoenix, Arizona, US
|
|-
|Win
|align=center|4–1
|Robert Maldonado
|TKO
|RITC 63: It's Time
|
|align=center|1
|align=center|1:47
|Phoenix, Arizona, US
|
|-
|Win
|align=center|3–1
|Gabriel Casillas
|Decision (unanimous)
|RITC 49: Stare Down
|
|align=center|3
|align=center|3:00
|Phoenix, Arizona, US
|
|-
|Loss
|align=center|2–1
|Bret Bergmark
|TKO (punches)
|WEC 6: Return of a Legend
|
|align=center|1
|align=center|3:57
|Lemoore, California, United States
|
|-
|Win
|align=center|2–0
|Rich Moss
|Submission (keylock)
|RITC 45: Finally
|
|align=center|1
|align=center|1:26
|Phoenix, Arizona, US
|
|-
|Win
|align=center|1–0
|Hector Figueroa
|Submission (guillotine choke)
|RM 2: Reto Maximo 2
|
|align=center|1
|align=center|4:15
|Tijuana, Mexico
|
|-

References

External links
UFC Profile

1980 births
People from Grass Valley, California
Living people
American male mixed martial artists
Mixed martial artists from California
Welterweight mixed martial artists
Mixed martial artists utilizing Brazilian jiu-jitsu
Sportspeople from Carlsbad, California
Ultimate Fighting Championship male fighters
American practitioners of Brazilian jiu-jitsu
People awarded a black belt in Brazilian jiu-jitsu